Cardplayers in a Sunlit Room (1658) is an oil-on-canvas painting by the Dutch painter Pieter de Hooch; it is an example of Dutch Golden Age painting and is now in the Royal Collection, and on display at the Queen's Gallery in London.

This painting was documented by Hofstede de Groot in 1908, who wrote:254. THE CARD-PLAYERS. Sm. 48. ; de G. 41.

In the right-hand corner of a room with a wooden ceiling and a tiled floor a young lady and a gentleman are playing cards at a table, while two other gentlemen look on. The lady, seated on the right, is about to play a card from her hand. On her left stands a cavalier, holding a pipe in his right hand; he wears a plumed hat and a doublet of light grey with pink ribbons; a grey cloak hangs upon a peg to the right. To the right of the lady sits another cavalier with cards in his hand, who glances up at the gentleman. A third young man, bareheaded and seen in full light, sits, with his back half-turned to the spectator, at the left-hand front corner of the table, drinking a glass of wine; he wears a black velvet jacket, yellow stockings, and high-heeled shoes.

By the wall to the right is a couch with red velvet cushions. The room is flooded with light from a large window, divided into four compartments, behind the group. To the left an open door looks into a courtyard, through which a servant-girl comes with a jug and some pipes. Behind her is a house with a passage leading into a garden. This is one of the finest of the master's works.
" The extraordinary luminous effect which pervades this picture renders it the admiration of every beholder. It is painted with singular mastery of hand, and exhibits throughout a consummate knowledge of the principles of art " (Sm.).

Signed and dated 1658 ; canvas, 30 inches by 25 1/2 inches. Mentioned by Waagen (ii. n). Exhibited in the British Gallery in 1826 and 1827.

Sales:
 Is. Walraven, Amsterdam, October 14, 1763 (Terwesten, p. 504), No. 16 (480 florins, Van der Land).
 Nic. Doekscheer, Amsterdam, September 9, 1789 (500 florins, Van der Schley).
 P. N. Quarles van Ufford, Amsterdam, October 19, 1818 (2270 florins, Roos).
 J. Hulswit, Amsterdam, October 28, 1822 (4500 florins).
 Formerly in the Pourtales collection, according to Seguier ; see catalogue of the Buckingham Palace collection.
 In the collection of Baron Mecklenburg, from whom Sm. bought it in 1825 (for 15,000 francs or £600), selling it to King George IV. in 1826.

Now in the Royal Collection at Buckingham Palace. It was listed as number 22 in the 1885 catalogue."

References

1658 paintings
Paintings by Pieter de Hooch
Paintings in the Royal Collection of the United Kingdom